Palliser Health Region is the governing body for healthcare regulation in an area of the Canadian province of Alberta. The area region includes the communities of:
 Bassano
 Bow Island
 Brooks
  Empress
 Medicine Hat
 Oyen

References
Ministry of Health and Wellness Annual Report: 2008/2009 (N.p.: Alberta Ministry of Health and Wellness, ca. 2009), pp. 27-42, at https://web.archive.org/web/20150924025400/http://www.health.alberta.ca/documents/Annual-Report-09-Palliser.pdf .
Global Air Rescue website, at http://www.globalairrescue.com/hospitals/air-ambulance-palliser-health-region-corporate-office.php .
Business & Industry Clinic website, at http://businessindustryclinic.ca/about-us/our-history/ .
Palliser Health Region EMS website, at https://web.archive.org/web/20150505094752/http://palliser-health-region-ems.alberta.canadab.com/ .

External links
 Palliser Health Region website

Health regions of Alberta